Commercial Operating System (COS) is a discontinued family of operating systems from Digital Equipment Corporation.

They supported the use of DIBOL, a programming language combining features of BASIC, FORTRAN and COBOL. COS also supported IBM RPG (Report Program Generator).

Implementations
The Commercial Operating System was implemented to run on hardware from the PDP-8 and PDP-11 families.

COS-310
COS-310 was developed for the PDP-8 to provide an operating environment for DIBOL. A COS-310 system was purchased as a package which included a desk, VT52 VDT (Video Display Tube), and a pair of eight inch floppy drives. It could optionally be purchased with one or more 2.5 MB removable media hard drives. COS-310 was one of the operating systems available on the DECmate II.

COS-350
COS-350 was developed to support the PDP-11 port of DIBOL, and was the focus for some vendors of turnkey software packages.

Pre-COS-350, a PDP 11/05 single-user batch-oriented implementation was released; the multi-user PDP 11/10-based COS came about 4 years later.  The much more powerful PDP-11/34 "added significant configuration flexibility and expansion capability."

See also
 Comparison of operating systems
 Timeline of operating systems

Notes

References

DEC operating systems
Time-sharing operating systems